Palmerton is a borough in Pennsylvania, United States.

Palmerton may also refer to:
Palmerton High School, a public high school in Palmerton, Pennsylvania
Palmerton Area School District, a public school district in Carbon County, Pennsylvania
Palmerton, Illinois, an unincorporated community in Cass County, Illinois, United States
Palmerton Arboretum, an arboretum in Rogue River, Oregon, United States